Men Without a Fatherland is a 1937 German drama film directed by Herbert Maisch and starring Willy Fritsch, Maria von Tasnady and Willy Birgel.

The film's sets were designed by the art director Erich Kettelhut.

In Latvia at the end of the First World War, a group of Freikorps battle against an attempted takeover of the Baltic States by Communist forces.

Cast
 Willy Fritsch as Oberleutnant Maltzach
 Maria von Tasnady as Irene Marellus
 Willy Birgel as Baron Falen
 Grethe Weiser as Jewa - Chansonette
 Siegfried Schürenberg as Hauptmann Angermann
 Werner Stock as Leutnant Berndt
 Erich Dunskus as Steputat - Unteroffizier
 Josef Sieber as Pleikies - Bursche
 Willi Schaeffers as Soykas - Landesrat
 Nicolas Koline as Diener Stepan
 Luis Rainer as Wolynski
 Aribert Grimmer as Bauer Rauta
 Lissy Arna as Mila Wentos
 Hans Stiebner as Kigull
 Maria Loja as Orla, Wirtin
 Traute Baumbach as Maruschka, ein russisches Bauernmädel
 Tamara Höcker as Ein kommunistisches Bauernmädel
 Valy Arnheim as Ein russischer Kommandeur
 Jur Arten as Ein russischer Offizier
 Boris Alekin as Ein Kellner im 'Sarasan'
 Johannes Bergfeldt as Ein russischer Offizier
 Zlatan Kasherov
 Werner Kepich as Ein russischer Agent
 Herbert Klatt as Ein Soldat der Kompanie Maltzach
 Karl Meixner as Ein Aufwiegler
 Hermann Meyer-Falkow
 Hans Meyer-Hanno
 Erich Nadler as Ein russischer Agent
 Hellmuth Passarge as Ein Soldat der Kompanie Maltzach
 Gustav Püttjer
 Arthur Reinhardt as Ein Soldat der Kompanie Maltzach
 Jakob Sinn as Zweiter Unteroffizier der Kompanie Maltzach
 Theo Stolzenberg as Popott - Besitzer des Tanzlokals 'Sarasan'
 Albert Venohr as Emmi de Néve
 Hugo Gau-Hamm
 Alexander Golling as Ischnikoff
 Kai Möller as Ein Soldat der Kompanie Maltzach
 Walter Raat-Kraatz
 Hans Sobierayski as Ein Kapellmeister
 Anny von Bornsdorf

References

Bibliography

External links 
 

1937 films
Films of Nazi Germany
German drama films
1937 drama films
1930s German-language films
Films directed by Herbert Maisch
Films with screenplays by Ernst von Salomon
German black-and-white films
Films set in Latvia
Russian Civil War films
Films set in 1919
UFA GmbH films
1930s German films